Thyriodes is a genus of moths of the family Euteliidae. The genus was erected by Achille Guenée in 1852.

Species
Thyriodes dissimilis (Druce, 1911) Colombia
Thyriodes flabellum Guenée, 1852 Mexico
Thyriodes terrabensis Schaus, 1912 Costa Rica

References

Euteliinae